Elacatinus evelynae, the sharknose goby, Caribbean cleaner goby, Caribbean cleaning goby, is a species of goby native to the Western Atlantic Ocean from the Bahamas and the Lesser Antilles to the northern coast of South America, as well as the Antilles and western Caribbean.

Appearance

Elacatinus evelynae is a very small, torpedo-shaped fish. It has a yellow stripe in front of each eye that joins to form a V  near the tip of its snout. Black stripes run under the yellow ones from the snout, over the lower part of the eye to the end of the caudal fin. E. evelynae's fin configuration is the same as all other gobies. Its dorsal fin is split in two, with a rounded anterior fin and a flat posterior fin which lines up with its anal fin. The pectoral fins are almost circular. All its fins are transparent.

Habitat

Diet
E. evelynae is a cleaner fish as indicated by one of its common names, the Caribbean cleaning goby. They feed on ectoparasites and dead skin found on other fish. E. evelynae also feeds on sponges, sea squirts, coral polyps, zooplankton and free-living copepods. Females tend to clean and feed more than males especially if they are accompanied by a large male, which may be due to mate guarding and the male spending more time guarding the eggs.

Reproduction
They are monogamous and are usually found in pairs near coral heads. Both males and females show aggression towards potential intruders of the same sex to protect their mates. Attempts to breed them in captivity have shown that they do not produce eggs unless conditions are optimal, with little to no fluctuation in temperature and salinity.

Name
The specific name honours Evelyn McCutcheon (1894-1977), of Salt Cay in the Bahamas, who provided hospitality to James Erwin Böhlke and his fellow ichthyologist Charles C. G. Chaplin.

References

External links
 

evelynae
Fish of the Atlantic Ocean
Fish of the Caribbean
Fish described in 1968
Taxa named by James Erwin Böhlke